Michael Swift may refer to:

Michael Swift (American football) (born 1974), American football player
Michael Swift (ice hockey) (born 1987), Canadian-Korean ice hockey player
Michael Swift (rugby union) (born 1977), Irish rugby player
Michael Swift (swimmer) (born 2000), Malawian swimmer